is a Japanese long-distance runner. He competed in the men's 10,000 metres at the 1992 Summer Olympics.

References

1964 births
Living people
Athletes (track and field) at the 1992 Summer Olympics
Japanese male long-distance runners
Olympic athletes of Japan
Place of birth missing (living people)